Frankfurt-Eschersheim station is a railway station located in the Eschersheim district of Frankfurt, Germany. The station is classified by Deutsche Bahn as a category 5 station and is part of the Main–Weser Railway.

Entrance building
The station building was built in 1877 and 1913, originally in the neoclassical style. The design is affected by the site's extreme slope: the street is two storeys above platform level. Services are now no longer available for passengers in the station building. The complex gives the impression of neglect.

The initial state of the entrance building has been greatly altered structurally since the beginning of the 20th century, so it is not classified as a monument under the Hessian Heritage Act, unlike many older station buildings to the north on the Main-Weser Railway. The opponents of the planned upgrade of the Main-Weser Railway from two to four tracks between Frankfurt West and (initially) Bad Vilbel have sought to have the entrance building heritage-listed, in an attempt to prevent the laying of two more tracks.

Services
The station is served by line S6 of the Rhine-Main S-Bahn. The pedestrian bridge that connects the entrance building on the street with the two external platforms was closed in the autumn of 2008 due to disrepair; it was last painted in 1965. The steps from this crossing towards the Friedberg end of the platform was blocked for several years before being replaced by a bridge connecting to a ramp to Thielenstraße. There is a pedestrian bridge over the tracks next to Maybachbrücke (part of Eschersheimer Landstraße, an arterial road). There are also ground-level entrances to the platforms, which will be removed in the planned upgrade of the line to four tracks, which will create one central platform with access from Maybachbrücke with stairs on both sides of the road bridge and a single lift on the north-eastern side.

Public transport
Eschersheim station forms a public transport node with the nearby Weißer Stein station of the Frankfurt U-Bahn. Weißer Stein is on line A of the U-Bahn and is served by lines U1, U2, U3 and U8.

Notes

References

Rhine-Main S-Bahn stations
Railway stations in Frankfurt
Railway stations in Germany opened in 1850